Kortney Wilson (born February 8, 1979 as Kortney Galerno) is a Canadian actress, country music singer, real estate professional, designer, and television presenter, best known as cohost with her former husband Dave Wilson of home renovation programming for HGTV Canada.

Background
She was born in Windsor, Ontario, and spent her childhood in Sudbury before her family moved to Kitchener when she was 13.

Musical career
As a youth in 1994, she was performing as Annie with Royal City Musical Productions in Guelph. By 1998 she had signed a management deal with Scream Marketing and Christy DiNapoli, a publishing deal with Scream Music Publishing in Nashville, and was working with Reba McEntire. In 2001, she issued two singles as Kortney Kayle on Lyric Street Records, but her debut album never materialized.

Her highest charting single was "Unbroken by You", which reached No. 50 in 2001. She also recorded with Dave as a duo. 
In 2001, Kortney Wilson also made several appearances on the soap opera, One Life to Live. She co-wrote Ryan Tyler's 2003 single "Run, Run, Run", which was also released by Krysta Scoggins.

Kortney Wilson was also signed to Open Road Recordings with Dave Wilson as The Wilsons. Dave had also recorded for Lyric Street. They later lost their recording deal and turned to other jobs and eventually to renovating and flipping houses in Nashville.

Music videos by The Wilsons years earlier, including Marry Me Again, Stick Together and Mine All Mine, continued to air on YouTube as of August 2018. Another music video featuring Kortney Wilson in 2001, under the stage name Kortney Kayle, titled Something To Cry About (Unreleased Song), was also still airing on YouTube.

Subsequent career
In 2006, Kortney and Dave Wilson did some cosmetic renovations on a home and sold it, at a $30,000 profit. The couple realized they could earn additional money by flipping other houses, initially part-time while continuing in music and other part time work. Eventually, this would become a full time business and later, the basis for their HGTV television programs. In 2008, Kortney Wilson got her real estate licence and she also took over the design aspects of the homes they were renovating. In the next year, the Wilson family began to star in the CMT Canada reality series Meet the Wilsons about trying to juggle a family (two children at that time) while pursuing music careers.

In 2015, they began working on their new series about buying, renovating and flipping houses, Masters of Flip, originally on the W Network. As of mid-2018, the series was running on HGTV in the US and Canada but also aired in numerous other countries. In May 2018, HGTV also began airing another reno/flip series with the Wilsons, Music City Fix; in the ten episodes, the couple renovated a "crumbling Craftsman bungalow" in historic East Nashville, Tennessee, while striving to retain as much of the original character as possible.

Masters of Flip ended after its fourth season, with the couple moving on to produce and host the new HGTV series Making it Home with Kortney and Dave.

Personal life
Kortney Wilson has joint Canadian/American citizenship.

Kortney Wilson was born in Windsor, Ontario but grew up in Sudbury, Ontario and then in Ayr, Ontario, Canada, before moving to Nashville at age 18. She was with Dave Wilson for 18 years and married for 14 of those. The couple first met when Dave (originally from Ottawa, Ontario) was working in England as part of a band, but was in Nashville on a writing vacation; he did not return to London after meeting Kortney. The couple announced on December 20, 2019 that they are separating and will divorce. They have two biological children, Jett and Sully and an adopted daughter, Lennox Esmee. In July 2021, Wilson introduced her Instagram followers to her boyfriend, Ryan and has continued to share relationship photos.

In October 2021, Scoop Nashville reported that Wilson's 17-year old son, Jett filed for emancipation so he could pursue his career as a day-trader. He cited he was miserable living with his mother and was aided in his court filing by his father. Jett confirmed this report on his personal Instagram account.

Discography

Singles

Music videos

References

External links
 
 

1979 births
Living people
Canadian interior designers
Canadian television hosts
Canadian women country singers
Actresses from Windsor, Ontario
Musicians from Windsor, Ontario
21st-century Canadian women singers
Lyric Street Records artists